Leandro Usuna (born 21 December 1987) is an Argentine surfer. He competed in the 2020 Summer Olympics.

References

External links

Living people
1987 births
Argentine surfers
Olympic surfers of Argentina
Surfers at the 2020 Summer Olympics
Pan American Games silver medalists for Argentina
Pan American Games medalists in surfing
Surfers at the 2019 Pan American Games
Medalists at the 2019 Pan American Games
Sportspeople from Mar del Plata